Yves Aubry is a Canadian ornithologist.

He graduated from Université Laval.
He is co-editor of the ornithology reference, "L'Atlas des oiseaux nicheurs du Québec méridional", published in 1995.
He is a member of Centre d'Étude de la Forêt.

Works
Gauthier J. and Aubry Y. (eds.) 1996. The breeding birds of Québec: atlas of the breeding birds of southern Québec. Association Québécoise des Groupes d'Ornithologues, Province of Québec Society for the Protection of Birds, Canadian Wildlife Service, Environnement Canada (Québec region), Montréal, Québec, Canada.
Hobson K.A., Aubry Y. and Wassenaar L.I. 2004. Migratory connectivity in Bicknell's Thrush: Locating missing populations with hydrogen isotopes. Condor 106: 905–909.

References

Canadian ornithologists
Living people
Université Laval alumni
Year of birth missing (living people)